Gideon is a fictional character, a mutant supervillain appearing in American comic books published by Marvel Comics. He was created by Rob Liefeld and Fabian Nicieza. Gideon was a member of the Externals, a unique type of immortal mutant, and an adversary of the X-Men spin-off group X-Force. He first appeared in The New Mutants #98 (Feb. 1991).

Fictional character biography 
Before Gideon's mutant powers emerged, he was a sailor with the Spanish armada sailing for the Americas several hundred years ago.  On one journey, he succumbed to scurvy and was buried when the ship reached land.  He awoke a few hours later, discovering his immortality.

Over several centuries, Gideon was able to amass a vast personal wealth. He also encountered and allied himself with several other Externals. He became the owner and CEO of Ophrah Industries in Denver, Colorado. At the end of the 20th century, the group began seeking out their newest member, whom Gideon erroneously believed to be Roberto da Costa, a young mutant who had joined the New Mutants, the junior division of the X-Men, and taken the codename Sunspot.  Gideon had known Roberto from a young age, having business relations with his father, a wealthy Brazilian businessman.  Gideon had his servant Eve poison Roberto's father Emmanuel, and Gideon approached the boy, telling him he needed to take over his family's business. He took the young boy in under his wing and began to mentor him.

Gideon later had AIM recreate Proteus. Gideon and Sunspot were later held captive by Arianna Jankos, Black Tom Cassidy, and Juggernaut. Gideon then publicly declared Cable and X-Force to be criminals. When the young superheroes known as the New Warriors broke into his home while he was taking a bath in his Jacuzzi, Gideon defeated them in an impromptu skirmish with their combined abilities. He then brutally tortured them to discover their agenda and to vent his frustration over their impetuousness.

Gideon mentored Sunspot for a short while, until it was discovered that not Sunspot but his New Mutants teammate and best friend, Samuel Guthrie (a.k.a. Cannonball) was the new External they had been seeking.  Gideon met with the other Externals, and proposed to send Crule to capture Cannonball. He contacted Crule, and then gave Sunspot over to one of his scientific labs, where they experimented on him and augmented his powers (at the great risk of killing him). Gideon forced Cannonball to promise not to interfere with External affairs in return for Sunspot's life.

Gideon attempted a hostile takeover of Genetech and the Taylor Foundation, but was thwarted by Night Thrasher and was defeated by him in physical combat. Gideon witnessed the External Nicodemus's death. Gideon was then offered a position with HYDRA, but refused and battled a HYDRA strike force. He was aided in defeating them by Nick Fury and S.H.I.E.L.D. Gideon was attacked and captured by X-Force, who then rescued Boomer, Siryn, and Warpath.

All of the Externals were eventually killed (except for Cannonball); Gideon was not spared and was killed by the energy vampire, Selene.

Gideon mysteriously appeared alive and well in the not too distant future, working beside Ahab against fellow External Cannonball (who was briefly killed by Ahab in the same issue). Later while investigating a disturbance in the timestream caused by the premature death of Candra, Cable travels back in time and discovers that Selene's attack on the other Externals did not work as they thought, and that they were actually alive but being targeted by some unknown assailant. Cable travels to Gideon's location and learns that he is still in stasis, recovering from Selene's attack. Cable is confronted by the mysterious murderer, a time travelling Gideon himself, who reveals that he spent 3,000 years in stasis and when he woke up, humanity had changed considerably. Deciding to prevent this outcome, Gideon traveled back in time to kill his fellow companions.

Powers and abilities
Gideon is a mutant who has the ability of Super Human Enhancement Assimilation: the power to temporarily endow himself with the super powers of any beings in his proximity, whether they are a superhuman, android, or mechanical battlesuit. He scans and replicates his target's energy signatures and genetic templates, granting him a full understanding of the potential applications of the powers he acquires and enabling him to overwhelm an opponent with a superior mastery of their own powers.

Gideon was an External, meaning his aging process is greatly slowed and that he can apparently regenerate injured or missing cells from even near-fatal injuries. He was granted with limited immortality, only ended by an extremely mortal wound such as losing the limbs, by the Legacy Virus (two Externals died by this method) or, in the case of his death, by a draining of the life energies.

Gideon is an extraordinary business strategist.

He wears body armor, and has access to androids, advanced vehicles, and other advanced technology developed by Ophrah Industries.

Other versions

Age of Apocalypse
In the alternate reality known as the Age of Apocalypse, Gideon was drafted to be one of the Horsemen of Apocalypse. Gideon, alongside Sabretooth, Candra, Death and War, planned to fire nuclear missiles at Cape Citadel. Gideon was selected to hack the computer system and fire the missiles. He was interrupted by Magneto, who he nearly defeated, until Magneto drew upon the Earth's magnetic field to overload Gideon's powers, apparently killing him.

References

External links
Gideon at the Marvel Universe
UncannyXmen.net Character Profile on Gideon

Characters created by Fabian Nicieza
Characters created by Rob Liefeld
Comics characters introduced in 1991
Fictional businesspeople
Fictional Spanish people
Marvel Comics mutants
Marvel Comics supervillains